A double tap is a shooting technique where shots are fired in rapid succession.

Double tap may also refer to:

In arts and entertainment:
Double Tap (film), a Hong Kong action film
"Double Tap" (Jordin Sparks song), a 2015 song by Jordin Sparks
"Double Tap" (Ministry song), a 2012 song by industrial metal band Ministry
Zombieland: Double Tap, 2019 film sequel to Zombieland

In technology:

SRAM Double Tap, a shift lever technology from SRAM Corporation
DoubleTap derringer, a small double barreled pistol
 Double tap, a form of the medical procedure tympanocentesis
 Double tap, the touchscreen equivalent of double-clicking
 Double tap, to tap a multi-touch touchscreen with two fingers simultaneously

In warfare:
Double tap missile strike, a tactic in which an area is bombed a second time to target those who respond to the first strike.